Roman Kudinov (born June 23, 1992) is a Russian professional ice hockey defenceman currently playing for Dynamo St. Petersburg in the Supreme Hockey League (VHL).

Kudinov played with HC Vityaz Podolsk of the Kontinental Hockey League (KHL) during the 2012–13 season.

References

External links

1992 births
Living people
HC Vityaz players
Russian ice hockey defencemen
Universiade medalists in ice hockey
Universiade gold medalists for Russia
Competitors at the 2017 Winter Universiade